Eugene or Gene Edwards may refer to:

Gene Edwards, evangelist
Red Edwards (Eugene Hoffman Edwards), American football player and coach
Gene Edwards (soccer executive)

See also
David Eugene Edwards, American musician